Babson College is a private business school in Wellesley, Massachusetts. Established in 1919, its central focus is on entrepreneurship education. It was founded by Roger W. Babson as an all-male business institute but became coeducational in 1970.

History

20th century
On September 3, 1919, with an enrollment of twenty-seven students, the Babson Institute held its first classes in the former home of Roger and Grace Babson on Abbott Road in Wellesley Hills. Roger Babson, the founder of the school, set out to distinguish the Babson Institute from colleges offering mainly instruction in business. The Institute provided intensive training in the fundamentals of production, finance and distribution in just one academic year, rather than four. The curriculum was divided into four subject areas: practical economics, financial management, business psychology and personal efficiency (which covered topics such as ethics, personal hygiene and interpersonal relationships). The program's pace assumed that students would learn arts and sciences content elsewhere.

Babson favored a combination of class work and actual business training. Seasoned businessmen made up the majority of the faculty. To better prepare students for the realities of the business world, the institute's curriculum focused more on practical experience and less on lectures. Students worked on group projects and class presentations, observed manufacturing processes during field trips to area factories and businesses, met with managers and executives, and viewed industrial films on Saturday mornings.

The institute also maintained a business environment as part of the students' everyday life. The students, required to wear professional attire, kept regular business hours (8:30 a.m. to 5:00 p.m., Monday through Friday and 8:30 a.m. to noon on Saturday) and were monitored by punching in and out on a time clock. They were also assigned an office desk equipped with a telephone, typewriter, adding machine, and Dictaphone. Personal secretaries typed the students' assignments and correspondence in an effort to accurately reflect the business world. Roger Babson aimed to "prepare his students to enter their chosen careers as executives, not anonymous members of the work force."

In 1969, Babson converted its three-year Bachelor of Science in Business Administration (BSBA) degree into a four-year Bachelor of Science (BS) degree. That same year, the institute became a college, and women were admitted for the first time.

21st century
Babson is involved in a three college collaboration with Olin College and Wellesley College (a collaboration often referred to as BOW).

Campuses

Wellesley Main Campus
It is adjacent to the Franklin W. Olin College of Engineering. Undergraduate and graduate students have the opportunity to take advantage of campus amenities including the student center, the cafeteria, Horn Library, multiple centers and institutes, the Webster fitness center, the Weissman Foundry the arts center, and a new centennial park known as the Kerry Murphy Healey Park, home of the second-largest rotating globe in the world at 28 feet in diameter. Executive and Enterprise Education visitors have the opportunity to stay in guest rooms adjacent to the meeting center.

Babson Boston
The Babson Boston classroom and event space, located at 100 High Street, gives Babson a presence in downtown Boston and connects the resources of the college with the innovative companies, organizations and leaders in Boston's Financial District. Opened in 2016, this facility provides the opportunity to offer MBA courses in a location convenient to where entrepreneurial students live and work. Over the course of the academic year, there are opportunities at the Boston location for students to engage with Babson offices and resources, including graduate programs, the Graduate Center for Career Development, Graduate Admissions and the college's alumni network. From 2011 to 2016, Babson Boston campus was at 253 Summer Street in Boston's Innovation District.

Babson San Francisco
Babson has a San Francisco campus which includes a Blended Learning MBA program, an undergraduate semester experience and custom executive education.

Babson Miami
In July 2017, president Kerry Healey announced Babson's plans to expand to Miami, Florida, where three graduate programs are offered: Blended Learning MBA, Master of Science in Business Analytics (MSBA), and Certificate in Advanced Management (CAM). Babson's new hub in Miami is located at 1200 Brickell Avenue.

Academics

Undergraduate
Babson College offers all undergraduates a Bachelor of Science degree. Students are also given the option to declare concentrations their junior and senior year from a broad range of subjects in various business and other fields. Programs are accredited by the Association to Advance Collegiate Schools of Business (AACSB) and the college itself has been institutionally accredited by the New England Commission of Higher Education or its predecessor since 1950.

In rankings, Babson was rated first among all colleges and universities in the nation by Money in 2014. In 2015, the magazine ranked Babson number one in 10 Great Colleges for Business Majors. Babson's MBA program was ranked 58th overall in the Bloomberg Businessweek 2014 rankings. Babson's undergraduate business program is ranked 26th overall in the Bloomberg Businessweek 2014 rankings. Babson's undergraduate Entrepreneurship program has been ranked number one for the past 17 years by U.S. News & World Report. In their 2013–2014 salary report, Payscale.com ranked Babson College at number five of all U.S. colleges and universities, ahead of schools such as Stanford, University of Pennsylvania, Harvard, Dartmouth, Columbia and Yale. This ranking represents an average mid-career salary of $123,000 and average starting salary of $59,700. In 2012, Bloomberg Businessweek ranked Babson eleventh among U.S. schools based on return on investment. CNN money ranked Babson eighth in their 2016 "Colleges with the highest-paid grads" rankings.

Graduate
Babson College offers master's degrees through its F. W. Olin Graduate School of Business, including a One-Year MBA Program, a Two-Year MBA Program, a 42-month Evening MBA Program and a Blended Learning MBA Program with campuses located in Boston, San Francisco and Miami. It also offers a Master's of Science in Entrepreneurial Leadership (MSEL), Business Analytics (MSBA), Finance (MSF) and a Certificate of Advanced Management (CAM).

Student life

In 2019, 3,663 students attended Babson, 3,229 of whom were undergraduates.

Student publications include a literary magazine and the Babson Built Podcast.

There are several fraternities and sororities on campus: Chi Omega, Delta Tau Delta, Kappa Kappa Gamma, Sigma Kappa and Sigma Phi Epsilon. There are also two professional business fraternities on campus: Delta Sigma Pi and Alpha Kappa Psi. Babson College Radio was started in 1998.

Babson offers a variety of special interest housing, such as CODE (Community of Developers and Entrepreneurs), theStudio (the housing associated with CREATE, the arts-based student club), E-Tower, ONE Tower: Origins of Necessary Equality, GIVE Tower, Healthy Living Tower and Women Giving Back Tower.

Athletics

Babson's teams are known as the "Beavers" and its colors are green and white. The school has 22 varsity sports teams, the majority of which compete in the New England Women's and Men's Athletic Conference (NEWMAC) of the NCAA Division III. One of Babson's flagship sports is baseball which has won 7 Conference Championships and been to 5 NCAA Tournaments, including the 2019 College World Series. Additionally, the men's soccer team has established a history of success with 3 NCAA National Championships, 27 NCAA tournaments wins and 12 conference championships. The men's and women's alpine ski teams compete in the United States Collegiate Ski and Snowboard Association (USCSA) and the men's lacrosse team competes in the Pilgrim League. Babson College's men's hockey team competes in the Eastern College Athletic Conference (ECAC) and has won (1) NCAA D3 National title, (1) ECAC D2 title, six ECAC East Championships, appearing in the championship game in 9 of the last 12 seasons . Babson College's golf team competes in the New England Collegiate Conference (NECC) and won the title in 2011 giving them an automatic bid to the NCAAs. They were led by senior captain Joe Young who won NECC golfer of the year in 2011. Babson United Rugby Club won Northeast region of NSCRO 7's in 2016. In 2017, the school will begin construction of the Babson Recreation and Athletics Center, a major new facility that will support varsity, intramural and recreational sports and many other activities by the fall of 2019. In March 2017, Babson's basketball team won the Division III National Championship.

Alumni

Business and athletics

 Ernesto Bertarelli '89: Swiss businessman
 Arthur M. Blank '63 H'98: co-founder, former CEO of The Home Depot
 Peter Boss MBA '10: race car driver
 Edward Maurice Bronfman '50 (1927–2005): businessman, founder of Edper Investments
 Matt Chatham MBA '11: former NFL linebacker with the New England Patriots
 Anthony Chiasson '95: hedge fund manager
 Matt Coffin '90: founder and former President of LowerMyBills.com
 Andrónico Luksic Craig '76: businessman
 Bob Davis MBA '85: founder and CEO of Lycos
 Edsel Bryant Ford II '73 H'00: Board Director of the Ford Motor Company
 Scott Fraser MBA '05, former NHL hockey player
 William D. Green '76 MBA '77 H'07: Former Chairman and CEO of Accenture
 Frederic C. Hamilton '48 H'98 MP'82 (1927–2016): oil pioneer
 Peter R. Kellogg '64: financial broker
John Kluge Jr. MBA '17, venture capitalist, philanthropist, son of billionaire John Kluge
 Will Langhorne '95: former race car driver
 Peter E. Madden '64 P'04 Honorary Trustee: former President of the State Street Corporation
 Charles Dean Metropoulos '67 MBA '68: co-owner of Hostess Brands and former owner of Pabst Brewing Company 
 Geoffrey Eric Molson MBA '96: co-owner, President and CEO of the Montreal Canadiens
 David G. Mugar '62: businessperson
 Gunnar S. Overstrom Jr. '65 (1942–2001): former Vice Chairman of FleetBoston Financial
 Aly Raisman Olympic gold medalist for United States women's national gymnastics team
 Scott Sharp '90: race car driver
 Jacob Sprague '07: rugby player
 Akio Toyoda MBA '82 MP' 14: President and CEO of Toyota Motor Corporation
 Tim Ryan, Senior Partner and Chairman of PwC US

Food and entertainment
 Marc Bell '89: entrepreneur
 Terrell Braly '77: founder of Quiznos
 Gustavo Cisneros '68 H'19: President/CEO of Organizacion Diego Cisneros
 Roger Enrico '65 H'86 (1994–2016): former CEO of PepsiCo and DreamWorks Animation SKG 
 Stephen Gaghan '88: screenwriter
 Daniel Frank Gerber '20 H'67 (1898–1974): founder of Gerber Products Company
 Bernard Lee MBA '99: professional poker player
 John LeFevre '01: former Citibank banker
 Mir Ibrahim Rahman '00: CEO of GEO TV
Nelson Woss '91: Australian film producer of Ned Kelly & Red Dog

Government, education, and other
 Craig Robert Benson '77, businessperson, former Governor of New Hampshire
 Vincent E. Boles MBA '88: Major General US Army 
 W. Haydon Burns '34 (1912–1987): 35th Governor of Florida, 1965–67 and 35th Mayor of Jacksonville, Florida, 1949–1965
Nick Collins '08: Massachusetts State Senator
 Princess Marie of Denmark: attended 1995-97
 Rudy Crew '72 H'96: President of Medgar Evers College
 Kathleen M. Gainey MBA '89: lieutenant general US Army
 James A. Lewis '58 (1932–1997): American politician
 Patricia E. McQuistion MBA '88: lieutenant general US Army
 Lafayette Morgan '58 (1931–2005): former Economic Advisor of Liberia
 Ernest Dichmann Peek '29 (1878–1950): major general, U.S. Army
 Gustavo Adolfo Carvajal Sinisterra MBA '84: the 24th Ambassador of Colombia to France
 Don Strauch '49 (1926–2016): former Mayor of Mesa, Arizona
 Jack Tilton (1951–2017) '74 P'09: art dealer

Fashion and fitness
 Michael Bastian '87: business person
Count Enrico Marone Cinzano '85: artist, furniture designer and member of Italy's prominent Cinzano liquor family
 Ruthie Davis MBA '93: founder, President and designer of the fashion and footwear firm RUTHIE DAVIS
 Natasha Esch '93: former President of Wilhelmina Models
Mohan Murjani '67: as Chairman of the Murjani Group Murjani developed, launched and built Tommy Hilfiger as well as Gloria Vanderbilt fashion empires
Alberto Perlman '98: co-founder of Zumba Fitness

References

External links

 Official website
 Official athletics website

 
1919 establishments in Massachusetts
Business schools in Massachusetts
Educational institutions established in 1919
New England Hockey Conference teams
Private universities and colleges in Massachusetts
Universities and colleges in Norfolk County, Massachusetts
Wellesley, Massachusetts